Tom Galligan may refer to:
 Tom Galligan (cinematographer) (1891–1965),  American cinematographer
 Tom Galligan (college president) (born 1955), president of Louisiana State University
 Tom Galligan (mayor) (born 1946), mayor of Jeffersonville, Indiana